Ancylostoma pluridentatum is a species of parasitic hookworm that infects wild species of cats. This hookworm is found in the tropical and subtropical parts of the Western Hemisphere.

References 

Ancylostomatidae
Parasitic diseases
Nematodes described in 1905